The following is an incomplete list of starting quarterbacks that have started a regular season or post-season game for the Edmonton Eskimos / Elks of the Canadian Football League (CFL). They are listed in order of appearance during the regular season or post-season, since 1996. Prior years do not include post-season starts and list number of starts from greatest to fewest.

Starting quarterbacks by season

Where known, the number of games they started during the season is listed to the right:

References
 2021 CFL Guide
 Stats Crew Edmonton Elks
 CFLdb Statistics

Edmonton Elks
Starting quarterbacks